Amanogawa may refer to:

 Amanogawa (river)
 6247 Amanogawa, an asteroid
 "Heavenly River", the Japanese name for the Milky Way